Jark is a village in Horjand Rural District, Kuhsaran District, Ravar County, Kerman Province, Iran. At the 2006 census, its population was 179, in 47 families.

References 

Populated places in Ravar County